The Golden Voice is a studio album by Filipino singer-actress Nora Aunor, released in 1970 by Alpha Records Corporation in the Philippines in LP format and later released in 1999 in a compilation/ cd format.  The album contains some of the original Filipino compositions by Robert Medina, George Canseco and Danny Subido.  The album contains 12 tracks among them "Mother Song" which became one of the most popular songs of Ms. Aunor.

Background
This album collection captures the music of three greatest Filipino composers of all time; George Canseco, Danny Subido and Robert Medina. The recording captures all the wondrous melodic qualities and varieties that are essence of the great composers music, songs which are sung in the way Nora Aunor can, with heart, emotion and above all total sincerity.  It is a performance that you will enjoy for years to come... a great singer with the Golden Voice - 'From "The Golden Voice" album Cover

Track listing

 Side one 

 Side two 

 Album credits 
Arranged and conducted by

 Doming Valdez
 Sweetheart, Sweetheart My Song I'll Wait for Someone Mother SongArranged by

 Orly Ilacad
 Crazy Feeling Lucky Girl All I Own The End of Our Love Danny Subido
 Heavenly Father Oh Promise Me My Little Boy''

Recorded at
 CAI Studios

References 

Nora Aunor albums
1970 albums